A Rage to Live is a 1949 novel by John O'Hara. it was a bestseller upon release. The novel is described as a large-scale social chronicle, depicting a wide swath of American society, set in the fictional locale of Fort Penn, PA. 

The book achieved commercial success, appearing in Publishers Weekly's list of the top ten best-selling fiction works in the United States in the year 1963. A film based on the book was released in 1965.

References

1949 American novels
Novels by John O'Hara
Novels set in Pennsylvania
Random House books